Capucci is a surname. Notable people with the surname include:

 Roberto Capucci (born 1930), Italian fashion designer
 Hilarion Capucci (1922–2017), titular archbishop of Caesarea in Palaestina
 Nicola Capocci (died 1368), Italian cardinal
 Débora Capucci (Born 1967) neuropsychologist. Rosario. Argentina
 Gustavo Federico Capucci (born 1984) QA tester. Cordoba. Argentina.

Italian-language surnames